Bavan may refer to:

Iran 
 Bavan-e Olya (بوان - Bavān), Fars Province
 Bavan-e Sofla (بوان - Bavān), Fars Province
 Bavan-e Vosta (بوان - Bavān), Fars Province
 Bavan, Isfahan (بوان - Bavān)
 Bavan, Kermanshah (باوان - Bāvān)
 Bavan, Silvaneh (باوان - Bāvān), Urmia County, West Azerbaijan Province
 Bavan, Sumay-ye Beradust (باوان - Bāvān), Urmia County, West Azerbaijan Province

Ireland 
 Bavan, County Donegal, a townland in Kilcar, County Donegal, Ireland